Brent Lepistu (born 26 March 1993) is an Estonian professional footballer who plays as a midfielder for Liga I club CS Mioveni.

Club career

Flora
Lepistu came through the Flora youth system. He moved to Esiliiga club Warrior on loan for the 2009 season. On 17 April 2013, Lepistu made his debut for Flora's first team in a 6–0 away win over Pärnu Linnameeskond in the Estonian Cup quarter-finals. He made his debut in the Meistriliiga on 21 May 2013, in a 6–0 victory over Kuressaare at A. Le Coq Arena. Lepistu won his first Meistriliiga title in the 2015 season. In February 2017, Lepistu was named club captain by manager Arno Pijpers. He won his second Meistriliiga title in the 2017 season.

Kristiansund
On 20 December 2017, Lepistu signed a two-and-a-half-year contract with Norwegian Eliteserien club Kristiansund.

FC Lahti
On 31 July 2019, Lepistu signed a half-year contract with Finnish Veikkausliiga club FC Lahti.

International career
Lepistu began his youth career in 2009 with the Estonia under-17 team. He represented the under-19 team at the 2012 UEFA European Under-19 Championship in Estonia. Lepistu played in every group stage match, but failed to help the team progress to the semi-finals as Estonia lost all three games against Portugal, Greece and Spain. He also represented the under-21, and under-23 national sides.

Lepistu made his senior international debut for Estonia on 27 December 2014, in a 0–3 away loss to Qatar in a friendly.

Personal life
In 2022, Lepistu began dating tennis player Anett Kontaveit. Since 2023, Lepistu lives in Pitești, Romania where Kontaveit has visited him.

Career statistics

International

Honours

Club
Flora U21
Esiliiga: 2014, 2015
Flora
Meistriliiga: 2015, 2017
Estonian Cup: 2012–13, 2015–16
Estonian Supercup: 2014, 2016

Levadia
Meistriliiga: 2021
Estonian Cup: 2020–21
Estonian Supercup: 2022

Estonia
Baltic Cup runner-up: 2018

References

External links

1993 births
Living people
Footballers from Tallinn
Estonian footballers
Association football midfielders
FC Elva players
Esiliiga players
FC Warrior Valga players
Meistriliiga players
FC Flora players
Eliteserien players
Kristiansund BK players
FC Lahti players
Veikkausliiga players
FCI Levadia Tallinn players
CS Mioveni players
Liga I players
Estonia youth international footballers
Estonia under-21 international footballers
Estonia international footballers
Estonian expatriate footballers
Expatriate footballers in Norway
Estonian expatriate sportspeople in Norway
Expatriate footballers in Finland
Estonian expatriate sportspeople in Finland
Expatriate footballers in Romania
Estonian expatriate sportspeople in Romania